Giovanni Carlo Coppola (died 1606) was a Roman Catholic prelate who served as Bishop of Muro Lucano (1643–1652).

Biography

Giovanni Carlo Coppola was born in Gallipoli, Italy.
On 18 May 1643, Giovanni Carlo Coppola was appointed during the papacy of Pope Urban VIII as Bishop of Muro Lucano.
He served as Bishop of Muro Lucano until his death in 1652.

References

External links and additional sources
 (for Chronology of Bishops) 
 (for Chronology of Bishops) 

17th-century Italian Roman Catholic bishops
Bishops appointed by Pope Urban VIII
1652 deaths